A bramble is any rough, tangled, prickly shrub, usually in the genus Rubus, which grows blackberries, raspberries, or dewberries. "Bramble" is also used to describe other prickly shrubs, such as roses (Rosa species). The fruits include blackberries, arctic brambleberries, or raspberries, depending on the species, and are used to make jellies, jams, and preserves.

In British English, bramble usually refers to the common blackberry, Rubus fruticosus. R. fruticosus grows abundantly in all parts of the British Isles, and harvesting the fruits in late summer and autumn is often considered a favourite pastime. An especially hardy plant, bramble bushes can also become a nuisance in gardens, sending down strong suckering roots amongst hedges and shrubs and being particularly resilient against pruning. Many consider R. fruticosus a weed due its tendency to grow in neglected areas and its sharp, tough thorns, which can be hazardous to children and pets.

Description 
Bramble bushes have long, thorny, arching shoots and root easily. They send up long, arching canes that typically do not flower or set fruit until the second year of growth; some varieties, known as 
everbearing or primocane bearing produce fruit on the tips of first-year canes. Brambles usually have trifoliate or palmately-compound leaves.

Bramble fruits are aggregate fruits. Each small unit is called a drupelet. In some, such as the blackberry, the flower receptacle is elongated and part of the ripe fruit, making the blackberry an aggregate-accessory fruit.

Etymology 
"Bramble" comes from Old English bræmbel, a variant of bræmel. It ultimately descends from Proto-Germanic *brēm-, whence come also English broom, German , Dutch  and French .

Ecology 

Most species are important for their conservation and wildlife value in their native range. The flowers attract nectar-feeding butterflies and hoverflies, and are a particular favourite of Volucella pellucens.

Being a pioneer plant on the verge between a meadow and a forest, blackberries can prove to be a valuable protective nurse crop for the perennial plants that will replace them.

Brambles are important food plants for the larvae of several species of Lepidoptera. The leaves are often used to feed captive stick insects. (The young leaves contain a toxin that can be harmful to many stick insects, but they develop an immunity to it by their third instar.) Many birds, such as the common blackbird, and some mammals will feed on the nutritious fruits in autumn.

Uses 

Many species are grown and bred for their fruit. Ornamental species can be grown for flowers (e.g. Rubus trilobus), for their ornamental stems (e.g. R. cockburnianus) and some as ground cover (e.g. R. tricolor). Members of Rubus tend to have a brittle, porous core and an oily residue along the stalk which makes them ideal to burn, even in damp climates. The thorny varieties are sometimes grown for game cover and occasionally for protection.

Split bramble stems are traditionally used as binding material for straw in production of lip-work basketry, such as lip-work chairs and bee skeps and sometimes used to protect other fruits such as strawberries.

Control of common blackberry 

R. fruticosus is difficult to eradicate once it has become established. Early action by pulling with a gloved hand and digging young seedlings as soon as they are seen will save a lot of hard work later. A thick mulch of chipped bark or compost will also make it much easier to pull out recently germinated seeds in the spring. Anything left below ground may regenerate.

Heavy infestations may make the land completely impenetrable and will require cutting first just to access the stems. The root systems will also be so pervasive that removing them would require digging up the entire area; doing this in woodland areas will cause unacceptable damage to the surface roots of trees and to flowering bulbs and should be avoided. In this case, chemical control using a selective weedkiller such as triclopyr to wet the photosynthesising bramble leaves is very effective if applied in accordance with the manufacturer's instructions. However, a heavily infested area of uncut brambles will require an inordinate amount of poison to wet the leaves; it is far cheaper, and more effective, to cut the area as close to ground level as possible in the spring, clear the debris into piles to reveal the ground surface and to accurately spot spray the shoots that will emerge two to three weeks later as soon as they have a small amount of new foliage. This will kill the plant back into its root system using a small fraction of the poison required to spray whole bushes. The area may first be cleared using a tractor-mounted rotary mower, motorised string trimmer or with a scythe. A short-bladed  scythe in good hands can be faster than using a string trimmer, leaves a neater cut close to the ground, avoids collateral damage to other plants that are desirable to keep, and deposits the cut debris aligned in swathes that are easier to remove and stack. The area must be cut and cleared at some point anyway and it is easier to clear the debris while green and flexible than dead and dry, so clearing when green then spraying a little is more efficient than spraying a lot then clearing when dry.

Triclopyr is highly selective: it only affects actively photosynthesising dicots, leaving grass, and flowering monocots such as narcissus and bluebell bulbs, undamaged. It also breaks down harmlessly in the soil within about six weeks leaving no toxic residuals. Glyphosate is also effective but must be used with much greater care and will damage other woodland plants.

An organic, long-term approach involves utilising the pioneering properties of the plant. The brambles are used to protect young trees from grazers and when the trees grow up, they permanently out-shade the blackberry patches; blackberries cannot abide deep shade.

Cultivation 

There are many different systems developed for the commercial culture of blackberries and raspberries. Bramble cultivars are separated into several categories based on their growth habit. They are categorised as erect, semi-erect, or trailing.

Plants bearing thorns, brambles, spines, or prickles are often used as a defence against burglary, being strategically planted below windows or around the entire perimeter of a property. They also have been used to protect crops and livestock against marauding animals. Examples include hawthorn hedges in Europe, Agaves in the Americas and in other countries where they have been introduced, Osage Orange in the prairie states of the US, and Sansevieria in Africa.

Culture
 Androcles, a traditional folktale describing a fugitive slave in ancient Greece who befriended a lion by removing a thorn from its paw.
 The Book of Genesis recounts the creation of thorns as one of the punishments for the disobedience of Adam and Eve on their expulsion from the Garden of Eden stating, "Thorns also and thistles shall [the ground] bring forth to thee; and thou shalt eat the herb of the field." 
 The Maid Freed from the Gallows (alt. The Briery Bush), a story from the collection The Child Ballads compares the heroine's plight to being caught in "the briery bush" or "the prickly bush".
 Sleeping Beauty, a traditional fairy tale recounting a princess cursed to sleep for a hundred years in a castle protected by impenetrable brambles.

See also 
Rubus probativus

References 

Rubus
Plant common names